"All Night" is a pop rock and power pop song by American pop rock band R5. It was released on June 2, 2015 as the third single from Sometime Last Night, along with the album's iTunes pre-order. The song was announced on May 28 as the album's opening track.

Music video
The "All Night" music video was released on July 8, 2015. It was filmed solely in a club bathroom with several of R5's friends including brother DJ Ryland Lynch, Courtney Eaton, Collins Key, Allison Holker, Riker's partner from season 20 of Dancing with the Stars and actors Michael Rosenbaum and Alfonso Ribeiro.

Reception
"All Night" received positive reviews from music blogs. Teen magazine Fanlala described it as "the perfect summer love song." A writer from Shine On Media said "All Night" has "the R5 sound but it also has an old school rock vibe which we love."

References

2015 songs
R5 (band) songs
Hollywood Records singles
2015 singles
Songs written by Ben Berger
Songs written by Ryan McMahon (record producer)
Songs written by Ryan Rabin
Song recordings produced by Captain Cuts